Argyrotaenia coconinana is a species of moth of the family Tortricidae. It is found in the United States, where it has been recorded from Colorado, Arizona and New Mexico.

The length of the forewings is 11–13 mm for males 11–12 mm for females. The forewings are pale red brown with a whitish to yellowish-white longitudinal streak and a pale red-brown line above this streak, as well as a dark copper-brown line. The hindwings are white, with pale gray overscaling. Adults have been recorded on wing in June and July.

Etymology
The species name is derived from the county of Coconino in Arizona.

References

Moths described in 2000
coconinana
Moths of North America